Jo Hye-hyok (born 25 July 1989) is a North Korean former footballer. He represented North Korea on at least two occasions in 2007.

Career statistics

International

References

1989 births
Living people
North Korean footballers
North Korea international footballers
Association football goalkeepers